A by-election was held for the New South Wales Legislative Assembly seat of Maroubra on 22 October 1983. It was triggered by the resignation of Bill Haigh who had been dropped as Minister for Corrective Services in October 1981.

The Maroubra by-election was held the same day as the by-elections for Kogarah, Marrickville and Riverstone. All were safe Labor seats and while there was a swing against Labor in each seat (7.2% to 11.8%), all were retained by Labor.

Dates

Result 

Bill Haigh resigned.

See also
Electoral results for the district of Maroubra
List of New South Wales state by-elections

References 

1983 elections in Australia
New South Wales state by-elections
1980s in New South Wales
October 1983 events in Australia